Daniel James 'Danny' McLauchlan (born 12 December 1977) is an Australian cricketer.

Originally from Sydney, New South Wales, McLauchlan was a member of the Australia Under-19 cricket team that toured Pakistan in March 1997 and played in two Under-19 Tests and an Under-19 One Day International. He moved to Western Australia and was selected to play in the final two 2006–07 Pura Cup season, taking 4 wickets for 76 runs in his first-class cricket debut.

McLauchlan was contracted with Western Australia for the 2007/08 season, after his impressive debut performance and performing well for Western Australian Grade Cricket team Scarborough Cricket Club throughout the previous summer.

He played a number of List A and Twenty20 games for Western Australia during the 2007/08 season, but was not offered a contract for 2008/09.

Returning to Sydney, he continued to play cricket in the Sydney Cricket Association, but has (at the end of season 2014/15) been suspended a record ten times for a wide range of Code of Conduct Breaches mostly involving crude and/or offensive verbal attacks on opposing players and umpires. At the end of the 2014/15 season McLaughlan moved away from Sydney Grade Cricket taking up a role playing in the First Grade competition in Newcastle. Within only a few games of that season's start he was once again in hot water with match officials being cited for a range of abuse of umpire issues.

References

External links

Living people
1977 births
Australian cricketers
Cricketers from New South Wales
Western Australia cricketers